Robert (Jerry) Amos Foster (7 December 1907 – 17 July 1984) was a Scotland international rugby union player. He played at Prop.

Rugby Union career

Amateur career

He played as a forward for Hawick.

The former commentator Bill McLaren mentions Foster as one of the Hawick greats that he grew up with:

"I was brought up on stories of the great Scottish players of the twenties, many of whom I never saw play but knew all about... I used to go with my father to see matches at a very early age, the great Hawick heroes including Willie Welsh, Jock Beattie and Jerry Foster, so I had an all-consuming desire to wear the green jersey of Hawick."

Provincial career

He represented South against the North of Scotland on 19 November 1932.

International career

Foster was capped by Scotland 4 times.

He made his debut against Wales in the Five Nations match at Murrayfield Stadium on 1 February 1930.

His last match was the Home Nations match against England at Twickenham on 19 March 1932.

References

1907 births
1984 deaths
Hawick RFC players
Rugby union players from Scottish Borders
Scotland international rugby union players
Scottish rugby union players
South of Scotland District (rugby union) players
Rugby union props